Albert Rosas Ubach (born 19 August 2002), sometimes known as Berto, is an Andorran professional footballer who plays as a forward for Spanish club Betis Deportivo Balompié, on loan from FC Andorra, and the Andorra national team.

Career
A youth product of FC Andorra and Lleida Esportiu, Rosas made his senior debut with Atlético Monzón, being loaned to the club on 2 August 2021. On 1 August 2022, after scoring 16 goals for Monzón during the 2021–22 Tercera División RFEF, he renewed with Andorra until 2025 and was loaned to Segunda Federación side Utebo FC.

On 31 January 2023, after scoring 11 goals overall for Utebo, Rosas was loaned to Real Betis' reserves also in the fourth tier.

International career
Rosas debuted with the Andorra national team in a 4–1 2022 FIFA World Cup qualification loss to Poland on 12 November 2021.

International goals
Stats correct as of 25 September 2022

References

External links
 National Football Teams profile
 
 

2002 births
Living people
People from Andorra la Vella
Andorran footballers
Andorra international footballers
Andorra youth international footballers
Association football forwards
Segunda Federación players
Tercera Federación players
FC Andorra players
Atlético Monzón players
Betis Deportivo Balompié footballers
Andorran expatriate footballers
Andorran expatriate sportspeople in Spain
Expatriate footballers in Spain